Football Club Chepinets is a Bulgarian football club based in Velingrad, currently playing in the A RFG Pazardzhik.

The club colours are red and blue, and their home ground since 1961 has been Chepinets Stadium.

History
Chepinets was founded in 1926. At the end of the 1956 season Chepinets reached the second tier of Bulgarian football for the first time in their history. In 1977–78 season Chepinets reached the Bulgarian Cup semi-finals, their best run in the competition, eliminating A Group sides Sliven and Levski Sofia along the way. In the following season they finished 3rd in the B Group, their highest ever league finish.

Current squad 
As of August 2, 2017

League positions

References

External links 
 Club profile at bgclubs.eu

Chepinets
1926 establishments in Bulgaria
Association football clubs established in 1926